Oakley House may refer to:
George D. Oakley House, Honolulu, Hawaii
Oakley Plantation House, St. Francisville, Louisiana, a National Register of Historic Places listing in West Feliciana Parish, Louisiana 
Annie Oakley House, Cambridge, Maryland
Van Buskirk-Oakley House, Oradell, New Jersey
John Oakley House, West Hills, New York
Violet Oakley Studio, Philadelphia, Pennsylvania
Oakley (Gallatin, Tennessee)
Ami and Amanda Oakley House, Springville, Utah
Oakley (Heathsville, Virginia)
Oakley Hill, Mechanicsville, Virginia
Oakley (Spotsylvania County, Virginia)
Oakley (Upperville, Virginia)

See also
Oakley (disambiguation)
Oakley Chapel African Methodist Episcopal Church, Tebbetts, Missouri, a National Register of Historic Places listing in Jefferson County, Missouri
Oakley Historic District, Oakley, Idaho